Danny Hill may refer to:
 Danny Hill (footballer) (born 1974), English football midfielder
 Danny Hill (rugby league) (born 1984), English rugby league player

See also
 Daniel Hill (disambiguation)
 Hill (surname)